"Risk It All" is a standalone single by English singer-songwriter Ella Henderson, choir the House Gospel Choir and producer Just Kiddin. It was released on 20 August 2021 through Major Tom's / Asylum Records and Warner Music Group. Described by critics as an uplifting euphoric dance and pop song, it features lyrics that speak of facing your fears in life and love, and giving a relationship a second chance. 

The song was promoted with live performances on BBC Radio 2's Breakfast Show with Zoe Ball and the homecoming ceremony for Team GB's Paralympics Team Homecoming. Upon its release, "Risk It All" debuted and peaked at 100 on the UK Singles Chart.

Background and composition
In 2015, a year after topping the UK Albums Chart with her debut album Chapter One, Ella Henderson began working on her second album. Despite completing album number two, Henderson suffered from severe anxiety which ultimately led to delays and her departure from Syco Music, for a new deal with Rudimental's label Major Tom's and Asylum Records. It was Rudimental that introduced Henderson to the London-based vocal group House Gospel Choir. The London-based vocal group gained prominence for performing with Kylie Minogue for her virtual concert Infinite Disco, in support of her fifteenth studio album Disco (2020), but have also recorded music with prominent producers Todd Terry, Alex Metric and Wookie.

Speaking about how "Risk It all" came about, Henderson said "When the Rudimental boys introduced me to House Gospel Choir, I knew I had to work with them. It was such an amazing experience collaborating with them and Just Kiddin on this song. I hope it uplifts you as much as it did us in the studio." "Risk It All" is a dance music and pop song with a "vibrant production" that invokes "euphoria" and lyrics that speak of giving a relationship a second chance. Henderson spoke about the song on her social media accounts, saying "it's alllllll about taking risks and not being afraid to face your fears in love and in life" .

Reception
Upon release, "Risk It All" received support from music streaming platforms and radio stations in the UK. It was playlisted by BBC Radio 1 and BBC Radio 2, as well as being picked as one "Hottest Record In The World Right Now" on Charlie Hedges's Dance Anthems show. Additionally, it was included on Spotify's 'New Music Friday' and 'All New All Now' playlists, as well as Apple Music's 'New Music Daily' playlist. "Risk It All" received a positive review from music critic Jon Stickler, from Stereoboard, who that said that Henderson's vocals combined with the choir's to "lift the vibe".

Promotion
On the day of release, 20 August 2021, Henderson appeared on Zoe Ball's Breakfast Show on BBC Radio 2 for a live acoustic performance of the song. The single's cover art was shot by photographer Matt Pearson and was accompanied by other photos, all taken during the music video shoot atop Seven Sisters Cliffs in Sussex, England. Henderson would later appear on 12 September with the House Gospel Choir at the Team GB Paralympics Homecoming Ceremony for a performance of "Risk It All", live on Channel 4.

Music videos
The music video for "Risk It All" features Henderson and the House Gospel Choir atop the Seven Sisters cliffs in Sussex, England. The theme of the video is around a "Last Day on Earth", with a couple departing for the cliffs and mark off activities from their bucket list as "an asteroid threatens the Earth". It features scenes of both "pre-Apocalyptic drama" and " young love and a gratitude for being alive", and "touches the dichotomy of love and fear". The video made its debut on 27 August 2021, and was directed by Lewis Cater. According to Promonewss Rob Ulitski, the video is "brilliantly realised... with a surprising feel-good factor".

A music video performance of the acoustic version of "Risk It All" was released on 10 September 2021. It was recorded at The Pool Studios in Bermondsey, London.

Track listing
Digital single
"Risk It All" (Ella Henderson, The House Gospel Choir, Just Kiddin) – 2:58

Acoustic single
"Risk It All" (Ella Henderson & The House Gospel Choir) – 3:18
"Risk It All" (Ella Henderson, The House Gospel Choir, Just Kiddin) – 2:58

Just Kidding VIP mix single
"Risk It All" (Just Kidding VIP mix) – 4:27
"Risk It All" (Club Mix) – 3:24
"Risk It All" (Ella Henderson, The House Gospel Choir, Just Kiddin) – 2:58

KC Lights remix single
"Risk It All" (KC Lights remix) – 3:21
"Risk It All" (Ella Henderson, The House Gospel Choir, Just Kiddin) – 2:58

Personnel and credits
Recording locations
The Pool (London, UK)

Personnel
Ella Henderson – vocals
House Gospel Choir – vocals
Henri Davies – vocal recording engineer
Sarah Dorgan – assistant engineer (acoustic version)
David Emery – mixing and mastering engineer (acoustic version)
Kevin Grainger – mixing engineer, mastering engineer
Charlotte Haining – background vocals
Billy Halliday – engineer (acoustic version)
Lizzie Jennings – choir arranger
Ben Loveland – assistant engineer 
Natalie Maddix – choir director
Robert Sellens – engineer
Lewis Thomson (Just Kiddin) – producer, background vocals

Charts

Release history

References

2021 songs
2021 singles
Asylum Records singles
Ella Henderson songs
Songs written by Ella Henderson
Pop songs
Dance music songs
Songs written by Robert Harvey (musician)